"Which Way You Goin' Billy?" was a global, multi-million-selling hit single from the Canadian band the Poppy Family. The single, first released in 1969, was from the album of the same name and was a chart-topping hit in Canada and Ireland. It was also a significant hit in other parts of the world, reaching #2 on both the U.S. Cash Box and Billboard pop charts.

The song was written by Terry Jacks and the lead vocal is performed by his wife Susan Jacks. The singer asks her husband Billy where he's going, knowing that he is leaving her. She pledges she'll still love him and stay his wife.

The single's B-side is a cover of Jody Reynolds' 1958 hit "Endless Sleep" and is sung by Terry Jacks.

Chart performance
In the group's native Canada, the single hit #1 on the CANCON singles chart dated 25 October 1969. It ranked as one of the ten biggest singles of the year (at #9) on the Canadian 'List of Biggest Singles of 1969' chart. In Billboard's ranking of the Top Hits of 1970, it was listed at #26 for the year. It also ranked at #5 on the 'List of RPM Biggest Adult Contemporary Hits of 1969'.

Subsequently, issued in the United States in March 1970, it was a million-selling Gold record-certified #2 smash on the Billboard Hot 100 chart that June. It was kept from the #1 spot by both "Everything Is Beautiful" by Ray Stevens and "The Long and Winding Road" by The Beatles.
It hit #6 on Billboard'''s Easy Listening chart.

In June 1970, it peaked at #2 on the South African singles chart.

Released in UK, it peaked at #7 on 26 September 1970.

The song was ranked #38 on the List of RPM Cancon number-one singles chart as published in the RPM'' magazine, dated June 24, 1996.

Allmusic critic Mark Deming states: "If the '70s were supposed to be about having a nice day, "Which Way You Goin' Billy?" shows the Poppy Family were one band waiting for a cloud to blot out all that annoying sunshine..."

Chart history

Weekly charts

Year-end charts

References

1969 singles
1969 songs
The Poppy Family songs
Pop ballads
Rock ballads
London Records singles
RPM Top Singles number-one singles
Irish Singles Chart number-one singles
Songs written by Terry Jacks